RAS guanyl-releasing protein 2 is a protein that in humans is encoded by the RASGRP2 gene.

The protein encoded by this gene is a brain-enriched nucleotide exchanged factor that contains an N-terminal GEF domain, 2 tandem repeats of EF-hand calcium-binding motifs, and a C-terminal diacylglycerol/phorbol ester-binding domain. This protein can activate small GTPases, including RAS and RAP1/RAS3. The nucleotide exchange activity of this protein can be stimulated by calcium and diacylglycerol. Two alternatively spliced transcript variants of this gene, encoding distinct isoforms, have been reported.

Clinical significance 
Mutations in RASGRP2 are associated with severe bleeding.

References

Further reading

External links
 
 

EF-hand-containing proteins